Aberdour railway station is a railway station in the village of Aberdour, Fife, Scotland. The station is managed by ScotRail and is on the Fife Circle Line.

History 
Opened by the North British Railway in 1890 (as part of the approach routes linking the Edinburgh and Northern Railway to the new Forth Rail Bridge), it became part of the London and North Eastern Railway during the Grouping of 1923. The line then passed on to the Scottish Region of British Railways on nationalisation in 1948. When Sectorisation was introduced by British Rail, the station was served by the ScotRail sector until the Privatisation of British Railways. The station has won numerous awards for its gardens.

The station was the location of a camping coach in 1957.

Services 
Sunday trains are also hourly, running round the Fife Circle.

References

Railway stations in Fife
Railway stations served by ScotRail
Former North British Railway stations
Railway stations in Great Britain opened in 1890
1890 establishments in Scotland
Listed railway stations in Scotland
Category B listed buildings in Fife
Aberdour